TMG I is the only studio album by Japanese-based supergroup Tak Matsumoto Group, released on June 23, 2004. Eric Martin and Jack Blades, of Mr. Big and Night Ranger fame respectively, wrote all of the lyrics, while Tak Matsumoto, the founder of the band and of B’z fame, was responsible for all of the music. The album topped the Oricon Albums Chart, selling over 90,000 copies, while the single "Oh Japan ~Our Time Is Now~" reached number 3 on the Oricon Singles Chart with 98,346 copies and was the 95th best-selling single of the year.

Track listing

Personnel 
Tak Matsumoto Group
 Tak Matsumoto – guitars, rap on "Oh Japan ~Our Time Is Now~"
 Eric Martin – lead vocals
 Jack Blades – bass, background vocals, co-lead vocals on "Everything Passes Away"

Additional musicians
 Brian Tichy – drums on tracks 1-9, 11, 14
 Cindy Blackman – drums on tracks 10, 12-13
 Akira Onozuka – organ on "Two of a Kind"
 Shinichiro Ohta – background vocals on "Trapped"
 Aimee Joy Misaki – voice on "Everything Passes Away"

Charts

Certifications

See also 
List of Oricon number-one albums of 2004

External links

References 

 

2004 debut albums
Tak Matsumoto Group albums
Being Inc. albums